Richland Creek is a stream in Callaway County in the U.S. state of Missouri. It is a tributary of Crows Fork Creek.

Richland Creek was named for the richness of the soil along its course.

See also
List of rivers of Missouri

References

Rivers of Callaway County, Missouri
Rivers of Missouri